Peter Joseph Edler von Kofler (29 July 170026 May 1764) was a mayor of Vienna.

References 

Mayors of Vienna
1700 births
1764 deaths